Robert Russell Whittaker (born September 18, 1939) is an American medical professional and former six-term U.S. Representative from Kansas, serving from 1979 to 1991.

Early life
Whittaker was born in Eureka, Kansas and was educated in the Greenwood County public schools. He attended the University of Kansas from 1957 to 1959, and Emporia State University during the summer of 1959. Whittaker earned his Doctor of Optometry degree (O.D.) from Illinois College of Optometry in 1962, and began practice as an optometrist. He was clinic director for the Kansas Low Vision Clinic in 1973.

Career
Whittaker's first foray into politics was as precinct committeeman and member of the city planning commission from 1970 to 1974.  He served in the Kansas House of Representatives from 1974 to 1977.

Whittaker was elected as a Republican to the Ninety-sixth and to the five succeeding Congresses (January 3, 1979 – January 3, 1991). He was not a candidate for renomination in 1990 to the One Hundred Second Congress. He is a resident of Colorado Springs, Colorado.

References

External links

 

1939 births
Living people
Republican Party members of the Kansas House of Representatives
People from Augusta, Kansas
People from Eureka, Kansas
American optometrists
University of Kansas alumni
Republican Party members of the United States House of Representatives from Kansas
Members of Congress who became lobbyists